Sunthan is a village in Kavrepalanchowk District of Nepal.

People
Chettris especially KCs

Crops
Maize, Potato, Wheat, Rice, Orange

References

External links
UN map of the municipalities of Kavrepalanchok District

Populated places in Kavrepalanchok District